Hyades is a thrash metal band from Busto Arsizio, Italy, formed in 1996.

History
Hyades was formed in 1996 by Lorenzo Testa. After 8 years of playing in the metal underground and releasing self-produced demos, the band signed with Belgian label Mausoleum Records and released their debut album, "Abuse Your Illusions", gaining worldwide attention.
A few years before the thrash metal revival really took shape, Hyades produced a blend of European and US old-school thrash metal with fast drumming, mosh guitar riffing, old-school vocals and socially critical lyrics, combined with a sense of humor.

After the release of "Abuse Your Illusions" in 2004, Hyades toured Europe with Omen, playing for the first time in Germany, Denmark, Austria, Belgium, Netherlands and Switzerland. 
The band released their second full-length album "And the Worst is yet to Come" in 2007 and continued to play all over Europe, sharing the stage with bands such as Onslaught, Sinister, Helstar, Tankard, Violator and others. Cover artwork was realized by Ed Repka, best known for creating Megadeth's mascot Vic Rattlehead and Dark Angel's logo.
Following the gig with Tankard the band was asked to take part in "Best Case Scenario: 25 Years in Beers", Tankard compilation/tribute album released by AFM Records in 2007, with a personal revisitation of Tankard's song "Alien", originally included on the "Alien" EP (1989).

In 2008 Metal Hammer UK (Thrash Metal Collector's Special 2008) listed Hyades among the most representative 30 thrash metal bands alive and playing, together with Exodus, Forbidden and others.
Hyades released the third album, titled "The Roots of Trash" in 2009 and toured again Europe. After the release of three albums in a short while, the band took a little break in order to concentrate to other musical projects.

At the end of 2014 Hyades signed a deal with Italian record label Punishment18 and started recording the 10 tracks of the new album in January 2015 at Studio Decibel in Busto Arsizio, Italy. The new album "The Wolves Are Getting Hungry", mastered by Andy Classen at Stage One Studio, was released on 29 June 2015.

Line-up

Current line-up
Lorenzo Testa - guitar
Marco Negonda - guitar
Rob Orlando - bass
Marco Colombo - vocals
Rodolfo Ridolfi - drums

Past members
Omar Ceriotti - drums (1996–2002)
Jerico Biagiotti - bass (2008–2009)
Mauro De Brasi - drums (2003–2005)

Discography
2002 - No Bullshit, Just Metal Ep
2005 - Abuse Your Illusions
2007 - And the Worst is Yet to Come
2009 - The Roots of Trash
2015 - The Wolves Are Getting Hungry

Demo
 1999 - Princess of The Rain
 2000 - MCLXXVII
 2001 - No Bullshit, Just Metal
 2002 - Hyades

References

External links

 at Myspace
 at Facebook
 at Encyclopaedia Metallum

Italian thrash metal musical groups
Musical groups established in 1996